is a district located in Fukui Prefecture, Japan.

As of October 1, 2005, the district has an estimated population of 3,405 and a density of 17.49 persons per km2. The total area is 194.72 km2.

Towns and villages 
The district has one town:

 Ikeda

History

Recent mergers 
 On October 1, 2005 - The city of Takefu merged with the town of Imadate to form the new city of Echizen.

Districts in Fukui Prefecture